Vevers is a surname. Notable people with the surname include:

Lorna Vevers (born 1981), Scottish curler
Stuart Vevers (born 1973), English fashion designer